Leonardo Basurto (14 March 1928 – 30 September 2009) was a Mexican wrestler. He competed in the men's freestyle bantamweight at the 1952 Summer Olympics.

References

1928 births
2009 deaths
Mexican male sport wrestlers
Olympic wrestlers of Mexico
Wrestlers at the 1952 Summer Olympics
Sportspeople from Mexico City
Wrestlers at the 1951 Pan American Games
Pan American Games bronze medalists for Mexico
Pan American Games medalists in wrestling
Medalists at the 1951 Pan American Games
20th-century Mexican people
21st-century Mexican people